Zearalenol may refer to:

 α-Zearalenol
 β-Zearalenol

See also
 Zearalanol
 Zearalenone
 Zearalanone